The 1978 Indian Open was a men's tennis tournament played on outdoor clay courts in Calcutta, India. It was the sixth edition of the tournament and was held from 27 November through 3 December 1978. The tournament was part of the 1978 Grand Prix tennis circuit. Fifth-seeded Yannick Noah won the singles title.

Finals

Singles
 Yannick Noah defeated  Pascal Portes 6–3, 6–2
 It was Noah's second singles title of the year and of his career.

Doubles
 Sashi Menon /  Sherwood Stewart defeated  Gilles Moretton /  Yannick Noah 7–6, 6–4

References

External links
 International Tennis Federation (ITF) tournament edition details

Indian Open
Indian Open
Indian Open
Indian Open